Judge Ellison may refer to:

James O. Ellison (1929–2014), judge of the United States District Court for the Northern District of Oklahoma
Keith P. Ellison (born 1950), judge of the United States District Court for the Southern District of Texas